Xiangdu District is a district of Xingtai, Hebei, China.

Administrative Divisions
Subdistricts:
Ximenli Subdistrict, Nanchang Avenue Subdistrict, Xida Avenue Subdistrict, Beida Avenue Subdistrict

Townships:
Dongguocun Township, Daliangzhuang Township

References

External links

County-level divisions of Hebei
Xingtai